Fasting and longevity is a concept of abstaining from food or practicing calorie restriction to reduce the burden of diseases and increase lifespan, although the relative risks associated with long-term fasting remain undetermined, as of 2021. Making dietary modifications, such as calorie restriction, dietary restriction, intermittent fasting, and time-restricted feeding, is under research for the potential to influence longevity.

Background 
Although the maintenance of health can be influenced by diet, including the type of foods consumed, the amount of calories ingested, and the duration and frequency of fasting periods, there is no good clinical evidence that fasting can promote longevity in humans, as of 2021.

Caloric restriction is a widely researched intervention to assess effects on aging, defined as a sustained reduction in dietary energy intake compared to the energy required for weight maintenance. To ensure metabolic homeostasis, the diet during calorie restriction must be of high quality, providing sufficient energy, micronutrients, and fiber. According to preliminary research in humans, there is little evidence that calorie restriction affects lifespan.

References

Fasting
Longevity
Life extension